The Syrian Civil War is an intensely sectarian war. After the early years of cross-sectarian opposition to the rule of Bashar al-Assad, the civil war has largely transformed into a conflict between ruling minority Alawite government and allied Shi'a governments such as Iran; pitted against the country's Sunni Muslim majority who are aligned with the Syrian opposition and its Turkish and Persian Gulf state backers. Sunni Muslims make up the majority of the Syrian Arab Army (SAA) and many hold high governmental positions, while Alawites and members of almost every minority have also been active on the rebel side. Despite this, Sunni recruits face systematic discrimination in the armed forces and ninety percentage of the officer corps are dominated by Alawite members vetted by the regime; based on their sectarian loyalty to Assad dynasty. SAA also pursues a truculant anti-religious policy within its ranks; marked by animosity towards Sunni religious expressions such as regular observance of salah (prayers), Hijab (headcoverings), abstinence from alcoholic drinks, etc.

The conflict has drawn in various ethno-religious minorities, including Armenians, Assyrians, Druze, Palestinians, Kurds, Yazidi, Mhallami, Arab Christians, Mandaeans, Turkmens and Greeks. In 2011, all the religious and ethnic communities, Muslim and non-Muslim, Arab, Turkmen or Kurd were united in their uprising against Assadist rule; disenchanted with the regime's corruption, authoritarian repression, nepotism, increasing poverty, unemployment, etc. Bashar al-Assad's strategy of importing Iran-backed Shia fundamentalists engaged in regional conflict with Sunni-majority countries and his portrayal as being the sole defender of Alawite interests from the Syrian Sunni majority; led to the transformation of the conflict into a sectarian war by late 2013.

Background
After early hopes that an era of political liberalization might follow Bashar al-Assad's succession of his father, these hopes flickered as Assad tightened his grip. He reined in Sunni Islamist opponents and sought to broaden his power base beyond minority sects. He promoted Sunnis to power and restored ties to Aleppo - a Sunni stronghold with which relations had been tense since the 1982 Hama massacre and the subsequent repression of the Muslim Brotherhood in the early 1980s.

Assad adopted a more religious persona than his father, e.g. leaking videos of one of his sons reciting the Qur'an. While continuing to look to Iran for military supplies, he improved ties with Turkey. Yet Assad's policy of criticising jihadism in Iraq and Palestine carried risks and "enabled previously latent ethnic and sectarian tensions to surface, Sunni groups to organize, and unsettled other sects and power clusters who had prospered under his father" Hafez al-Assad. Furthermore, the power and influence of Alawite elites in various sectors across the country; ranging from military, businesses, bureaucracy, etc. increased manifold times during the reign of Bashar al-Assad. Additionally, Assad regularly stressed his Alawite roots in public appearances in order to suppress the rising number of dissidents from the traditionally loyalist Alawite base, who had begun playing prominent roles for the Syrian opposition.

General issues
Both the opposition and government have accused each other of employing sectarian agitation. The opposition accused the government of agitating sectarianism. Invoking minority sentiments and fears had long been a key policy of the Assads to ensure the regime's support amongst disenchanted Alawites.The regime dispatched the most loyal of the Alawite army units to fiercely crush the biggest protests. Time Magazine reported that in Homs government workers were offered extra stipends of up to $500 per month to fan sectarian fears while posing as opposition supporters. This included placing graffiti with messages such as "The Christians to Beirut, the Alawites to the grave," and shouting such sectarian slogans at anti-government protests. Some protesters reportedly chanted "Christians to Beirut; Alawites to the coffin".

United Nations human rights investigators, concluded that Syrian civil war is rapidly devolving into an "overtly sectarian" and ethnic conflict, raising the specter of reprisal killings and prolonged violence that could last for years after the government falls. "In recent months, there has been a clear shift" in the nature of the conflict, with more fighters and civilians on both sides describing the civil war in ethnic or religious terms, "Feeling threatened and under attack, ethnic and religious minority groups have increasingly aligned themselves with parties to the conflict, deepening sectarian divides", said the report. Syrian state media also depicted Assad as a religious Shi'ite defending Shia interests in the region, which gained the sympathy of Iran-backed Khomeinist militants in the region. Khomeinist groups such as Hezbollah started sending thousands of troops, weapons and finances to Syria and began to actively participate in the crackdown on civilians. 

The sharpest split arose between the ruling minority Alawite sect, a heterdox offshoot of Shi'ism constituting about 12% of total Syrian population, from which President Assad's most senior political elites, military officers, generals and associates are drawn; and the country's Sunni Muslim majority, mostly aligned with the opposition, the panel noted. But it said the conflict had drawn in other minorities, including Armenian Christians, Assyrian Christians, Druze, Palestinians, Kurds, Yezidi and Turkmens. Taking advantage of the existing social tensions; state media began trumpeting the sectarian card to discredit the protestors, inorder to legitimise Assad's continuation and to gain critical support from those Alawites disllusioned with the regime.

Nevertheless, there were some trends at this point that were not in line with a developing sectarian war. On 12 February 2013, a CNN report from inside Talkalakh revealed that the town itself was under rebel control, though government forces were only a matter of yards away, surrounding the town. Nevertheless, there was no fighting in or around the town thanks to a tenuous ceasefire between the warring sides brokered by a local sheikh and an Alawite member of parliament. Though isolated clashes have occurred, killing three rebels, and though government forces have been accused of harassing civilians since its implementation, the ceasefire has largely held. The town has returned to a degree of normal function, and some shops have started to re-open. Even the governor of Homs Province has been able to meet with rebels in the town, and has called the ceasefire an "experiment". Both sides reject sectarianism, stressing the need to keep foreign jihadist fighters out of the country. Nevertheless, the mainly Sunni rebels in the town stated that they remained committed to overthrowing Assad.

International positions
In 2011, United States Secretary of State Hillary Clinton stated that the primarily Sunni protesters "have a lot of work to do internally" in order to gain the broad public support needed to form a genuinely national movement. She added, "It is not yet accepted by many groups within Syria that their life will be better without Assad than with Assad. There are a lot of minority groups that are very concerned." The opposition does include some prominent Alawites and Christians, but it is predominantly Sunni.

Turkey Prime Minister Recep Tayyip Erdoğan has been trying to "cultivate a favorable relationship with whatever government would take the place of Assad" regardless of the group.

Saudi preacher Sa'ad Ateeq al-Ateeq has called for the destruction of Shias, Christians, Alawites, and Jews in Qatar's Imam Muhammad ibn Abd al-Wahhab Mosque.

History

In 2012 the first Christian Free Syrian Army unit formed, yet it was reported that the Syrian government still had the support of the majority of the country's Christians of various ethnicities and denominations. By 2013 an increasing number of Christians favored the opposition. In 2014, the predominantly Christian Syriac Military Council formed an alliance with the FSA, and other Syrian Christian militias such as the Sutoro had joined the Syrian opposition against the government.

The Alawite sect of Islam has the second highest religious following in the Syrian Arab Republic and remains at the heart of the Syrian Government grassroot support; however, in April 2016 Alawite leaders released a document seeking to distance themselves from Shia Islam. The manifest titled "Declaration of an Alawite Identity Reform" stated that Alawism was a separate current "of and within Islam" and that the current political power (i.e. president Bashar al-Assad) did not represent the Alawite community. Incidents of sectarianism amongst the Sunni population have been said to be rooted in that both Hafez al-Assad and Bashar al-Assad are Alawites, a minority fundamentalist Sunnis see as heretics. Additionally, the Syrian government maintains a network known as the shabiha, a shadow militia that anti-government activists allege are prepared to use force, violence, weapons and racketeering, whose members primarily consist of Alawites. Iran provides training and equipping of Shia militants from Lebanon, Iraq, Syria, and Afghanistan to fight with various sectarian Sunni militias in Syria,. Minorities such as the Druze and Ismailis have refused to join these militias or be associated with the government, with even some Alawites and Christians who are openly pro-government also refusing to join these militias or serve their conscription terms.

Arab Sunnis

Even though most of the opposition are composed of Sunnis, Ba'athist sympathisers of Arab Sunni background are present in pro-government forces as well. The areas that have fallen under rebel control are mostly Sunni. Shabiha have been reported of killing and perpetrating sectarian massacres of Sunnis, prompting kidnappings and alleged killing of Alawites by the Sunni side. In addition, there have been numerous reports of sectarian violence against Sunnis by non-government Shiite Islamist groups, which have sought to justify their war-crimes by declaring that "We are performing our taklif [religious order]". In one incident in late January 2012, Reuters reported that 14 members of a Sunni family were killed by the shabiha along with 16 other Sunnis in a formerly mixed neighbourhood of Homs that Alawites had purportedly fled four days prior. Documented incidents of the regime's security forces targeting Sunni districts and villages date back virtually to the start of the uprising, including the shelling of Sunni neighbourhoods in Latakia by gunboats of the Syrian Navy in August 2011. Abandoned Sunni homes have also been systematically plundered to the extent that "the country's newly flourishing flea markets took on a new name, "souk al sunna." 

The massacres in Houla and Qubeir, both Sunni farming settlements on the fault line between Sunni majority areas and the Alawite heartland of the Alawite Mountains, are said to be part of a plan intended by radical Alawite elements in the north-west to clear nearby Sunni villages in order to create a "rump state" that is easy to defend. The Naame Shaam campaign has sought to highlight the sectarian nature of the Syrian government and the sectarian role of its main ally Iran, which includes attempts to alter the demographic composition of areas of Syria via the removal of Sunni inhabitants. Some citizens loyal to the Ba'ath party coming from Sunni background continue to serve in the Syrian armed forces, despite massive Sunni desertions. Some Sunni citizens who are critical of the Assad regime do not support the opposition as well; due to the sufferings caused by widespread devastation as a result of the civil war. Warnings of an alleged "Sunni triumphalism" in the scenario of an opposition victory has been a regular feature of Assad regime's propaganda since the eruption of the protests in 2011.

The Times of Israel reported in June 2014 that various individuals interviewed in a "Sunni-dominated, middle-class neighborhood of central Damascus" claimed support for Assad among the Sunnis in Syria. However, acknowledging the difficulty for establishing the true political opinion, the report states: "It is difficult to ascertain the popularity or discontent with Assad inside Syria. The country has a pervasive security apparatus in place that punishes people for speaking out against the ruling establishment... Many who supported and respected him.. have turned against him because of the violence his government has inflicted on those who oppose him, including the relentless shelling of rural, opposition-held areas around Damascus."

In late 2015, US Chair of the United States House Committee on Foreign Affairs, Ed Royce, described reports of Hezbollah-led sectarian purges across the country, stating: "I’ve been briefed on the fact that [Iran is] even bringing in militias from Hezbollah and their families into Sunni dominated neighborhoods in Damascus and running their Sunni population out as they basically do an ethnic cleansing campaign". SNHR reported in 2017 that the war has rendered around 39% of Syrian mosques unserviceable for worship. More than 13,500 mosques were destroyed in Syria between 2011-2017. Around 1,400 were dismantled by 2013, while 13,000 mosques got demolished between 2013-2017.

Assadist security forces tend to view ordinary Sunni civilians with suspicion, accusing them as potential "fifth columnists" tied to the Free Syrian Army. At the same time, Syrian Arab Army has relied mostly on Sunni conscripts to fill its manpower; while the leadership at higher military positions was almost exclusively filled with Alawite loyalists of Assad. To prevent the overt perception of Alawite dominance, certain high ranking positions were awarded to non-Alawite supporters of the regime, while the deep state remained under the firm control of Alawite loyalists. Sunnis also hold high governmental positions; the Prime Minister of Syria (previously Minister of Health) Wael Nader al-Halqi, the Minister of Defense and also Deputy Commander-in-Chief of the Army and the Armed Forces (previously Special Forces) General Major Fahd Jassem al-Freij, Foreign Minister Walid Muallem and Major General Mohammad al-Shaar, an Interior Minister, are some of the Sunni Muslims in the positions of power. There also operate pro-Assad Sunni militias composed of  Baathist loyalists, such as the Ba'ath Brigades. Brigades are made up of Sunni Syrians and other Arab Sunnis from the Middle Eastern region that adhere to pan-Arab ideals. However, these militias were disbanded in 2018 to consolidate the regime's monopoly over armed forces. 

In 2018, The Economist reported that most of the Syrians forcibly displaced by the Ba'athist regime belong to the Sunni community as part of a systematic sectarian cleansing campaign to re-mold the demography in favour of the Assad dynasty. Hardline Assadists often justify the bombings in Sunni-majority regions by labelling the Sunni residents as "terrorists". Law No. 10 implemented by the regime has dispensed out thousands of homes and properties owned by displaced Sunnis to Iran-backed Khomeinist militants and pro-Assad loyalists. Regarding the new religious policy adopted by the government towards its Sunni majority since outbreak of the civil war, The Economist article states: “the country has been led by Alawites since 1966, but Sunnis held senior positions in government, the armed forces and business... The country’s chief mufti is a Sunni, but there are fewer Sunnis serving in top posts since the revolution. Last summer Mr Assad replaced the Sunni speaker of parliament with a Christian. In January he broke with tradition by appointing an Alawite, instead of a Sunni, as defence minister.”

The controversial Law No. 10 passed by Bashar al-Assad in 2018 enabled the state to confiscate properties from displaced Syrians and refugees if they do not submit official documents within a timeframe of 1 year. The law is widely viewed as part of a social engineering campaign to remake Syria in the image of Bashar al-Assad, particularly by preventing the return of Sunni refugees. There are reports of regime plans to make Sunnis a minority within Syria in-order to consolidate its rule through the weaponization of Law no.10 and distributing vast swathes of confiscated properties to Assad loyalists and pro-Iranian militants. Increasing sectarian violence has also resulted in Sunni holy places being attacked by Syrian and foreign Shia militias and the Syrian Army. Middle East Monitor reported in 2020 that numerous Sunni shrines have been demolished as revenge for the alleged destruction of Shia shrines. An example of this is the destruction of eighth century Umayyad Caliph Umar ibn Abd al-Aziz's tomb in Idlib by the Syrian Army and Irania-backed Shia militias.

Alawites

Alawites in Syria are a minority, accounting for less than 20 percent of the 23 million residents in Syria. Discrimination of the Alawite sect accused of being kuffar by Islamists has a long tradition, and present-day Salafists still like to refer to fatwas like that of Ibn Taymiyyah (1268-1328) who considered Alawites more infidel than Christians or Jews.

Sunnis are the majority of the Syrian population. Journalist Nir Rosen, writing for Al Jazeera, reported that members of the Alawite sect are afraid of Sunni hegemony, as they were oppressed by Sunnis during Ottoman times and in the early years of the 20th century, the Sunni merchant class held much of the country's wealth and dominated politics. Following Hafez al-Assad's coup, Alawites' position in Syria improved under the government of Assad, himself an Alawite.

During the Syrian civil war, Alawites in Syria have been subject to a series of growing threats and attacks coming from Sunni Islamists. In 2012, Adnan Al-Arour, a Syrian satellite television preacher based in Saudi Arabia, said that Alawites who supported the government would be chopped up and fed to the dogs.

Reuters investigated the mood and the condition of the Alawite community in early 2012. Several Alawites said that they have been threatened during the uprising for their religion and that they feared stating their names in cities where Sunnis are the majority. Some with distinguishable accents have tried to mask their speech patterns to avoid being identified as Alawites, Nir Rosen reported at around the same time, a phenomenon he suggested was not unique to Alawites in the increasingly sectarian conflict. An Alawite originally from Rabia, near Homs, claimed that if an Alawite leaves his village, he is attacked and killed. Reuters reported that the uprising appeared to have reinforced support for President Bashar al-Assad and the government among ordinary Alawites, with a group of Alawites witnessed by its reporter chanting for Maher al-Assad to "finish off" the rebels. They were also convinced that if Assad fell, they would be killed or exiled, according to the investigation. Several claimed acts of sectarian violence had been committed against Alawites, including 39 villagers purportedly killed by Sunnis. Some also said that in cities like Homs, Alawites risked being killed or abducted if they ventured into Sunni neighbourhoods. Many are fleeing their homes in fear of getting killed.

The Globe and Mail reported that Alawites in Turkey were becoming increasingly interested in the conflict, with many expressing fears of a "river of blood" if Sunnis took over and massacred Alawites in neighbouring Syria, and rallying to the cause of Assad and their fellow Alawites, though the report said there was no evidence that Alawites in Turkey had taken up arms in the Syrian conflict. A voice purported to belong to Mamoun al-Homsy, a former MP in Assad's parliament and one of the early opposition leaders, warned in a recorded message in December 2011 that Alawites should abandon Assad, or else "Syria will become the graveyard of the Alawites". Jihadis in Syria follow the anti-Alawite fatwahs made by the medieval scholar Ibn Taymiyah. Simultaneously; anti-Sunni sectarianism arose drastically amongst Alawite loyalists of Bashar al-Assad over the course of the civil war.

Studies of social dynamics of the conflict point out that anti-Sunni sectarian sentiments were discreetly cultivated in the Alawite community by the authorities so as to cultivate a mechanism of "social fear" amongst its members of other alternatives to the Ba'athist regime; so as to ensure their loyalty. The rising sectarianism feared by the Alawite community has led to speculation of a re-creation of the Alawite State as a safe haven for Assad and the leadership should Damascus finally fall. Latakia Governorate and Tartus Governorate both have Alawite majority population and historically made up the Alawite State that existed between 1920 and 1936. These areas have so far remained relatively peaceful during the Syrian civil war. The re-creation of an Alawite State and the breakup of Syria is however seen critically by most political analysts. King Abdullah II of Jordan has called this scenario the "worst case" for the conflict, fearing a domino effect of fragmentation of the country along sectarian lines with consequences to the wider region.

Most of the reports by Western media of sectarian violence against Alawites from the rebel side have related to fighters from Al-Qaeda's Syrian affiliate al-Nusra Front. Al-Nusra perpetrated the Hatla (June 2013). In September 2013, Al-Nusra fighters reportedly executed at least 16 Alawite civilians in the village of Maksar al-Hesan, east of Homs, including seven women, three men over the age of 65, and four children under the age of 16. In October 2015, the head of al-Nusra, Abu Mohammad al-Julani, called for indiscriminate attacks on Alawite villages in Syria. He said "There is no choice but to escalate the battle and to target Alawite towns and villages in Latakia". Allied to al-Nusra, Turkistan Islamic Party in Syria leader Abu Rida Al-Turkestani gave a speech after the capture of Jisr al-Shughur inviting "Muslims" from "East Turkestan" to come to Sham in order to "kill" Nusayris (Alawites).

Other Salafist preachers have echoed this sectarianism. Alawites were attacked by Egyptian jihadi cleric Yusuf al-Qaradawi, based in Qatar. According to Sam Heller, Muheisini, a Saudi Arabian Salafi cleric who served as a religious judge in the rebel Army of Conquest, vowed to exterminate Alawite men and wrote that Alawite women could potentially be executed as apostates.

However, there have been allegations against the mainstream rebel Free Syrian Army (FSA). In December 2012, the massacres of Aqrab was initially attributed to pro-government militias but later alleged to have been perpetrated by rebels. In March 2013, Abu Sakkar, a commander of a rebel militia loosely affiliated with the FSA and later al-Nusra, was filmed cutting organs from the dead body of a Syrian soldier and saying: "I swear to God, you soldiers of Bashar, you dogs, we will eat from your hearts and livers! O heroes of Bab Amr, you slaughter the Alawites and take out their hearts to eat them!". Abu Sakkar claimed the mutilation was revenge. He said he found a video on the soldier's cellphone in which the soldier sexually abuses a woman and her two daughters, along with other videos showing Assad loyalists raping, torturing, dismembering and killing sunnis, including children. (The incident was condemned by the FSA leadership, who declared they wanted him "dead or alive".) In May 2013, an FSA spokesman said that Alawite settlements would be destroyed if the Sunni-majority town of Qusayr was seized by Assad loyalists. He added, "We don't want this to happen, but it will be a reality imposed on everyone". 

During the Syrian Civil War, the Alawites have suffered as a result of the community's perceived loyalty to the Assad government, and many Alawites fear a negative outcome for the government in the conflict would result in an existential threat to their community. In May 2013, SOHR stated that out of 94,000 killed during the war, at least 41,000 were Alawites. By 2015, up to a third of young Alawite men had been killed in the increasingly sectarian conflict. In April 2017, a pro-opposition source reported Russian media assertions that 150,000 young Alawites had died.

Alawites within the opposition
While there are Alawite activists opposed to Assad, Reuters describes them as isolated. Fadwa Soliman is a Syrian actress of Alawite descent who is also now known for leading protests in Homs. She has become one of the most recognized faces of the uprising. Monzer Makhous, the representative of the National Coalition for Syrian Revolutionary and Opposition Forces in France, is an Alawi.

In 2012, General Zubaida al-Meeki, an Alawite from the Israeli-occupied Golan Heights, became the first female military officer to defect to the opposition. Influential Alawite intellectual and dissident Dr. Abdul Aziz al-Khair was imprisoned by the Assad government in October 2012. This incident led to widespread outrage within the Alawite community, which was denounced by hardline Assad loyalists. A mass-shooting between Alawite clans polarised over regime's policies occurred at Qardaha, in the same month.

According to the Financial Times: "Opposition activists have worked hard to present a non-sectarian message. Video footage of protests in the Damascus suburbs shows protesters carrying posters with the crescent of Islam beside the Christian cross. Even exiled representatives of the [Muslim] Brotherhood, banned in Syria, have avoided sectarian discourse." A group calling itself the Coalition of Free Alawite Youth offered an alternative for Alawites who do not want to take up arms. It invited them to flee to Turkey, promising that "within a few days, will secure free accommodation for them with a monthly salary that will shield them from humiliation."

A new Alawite opposition movement, "Upcoming Syria", was founded on 21 November 2015.

Christians
Christians in Syria, the majority of whom are Arab Christians, along with Assyrian and Armenian minorities, make up about 10% of the population of Syria and they are fully protected by Syria's 1973 constitution, which guarantees their religious freedom and allowed them to operate churches and schools. However, the constitution stipulates that the President must be a Muslim.

On various occasions during the conflict, it has been reported that the Syrian government has received the support of some of the country's Christians. The Christians of Syria are members of various ethnicities and denominations.
In 2015, however, Syrian government recruiters were shot at while they were attempting to forcibly draft men in Christian areas.

In 2012, CBS News reported that some Christians support the Syrian government because they believe that their survival is linked to the survival of Syria's largely secular government. An Al-Ahram article reported that the officials of numerous Syrian churches supported the government to extent of turning in members of the opposition within their own churches. Michel Kilo, a prominent Christian in the opposition, blasted these churches and called for Syrian Christians to "boycott the church until it is restored to the people and becomes the church of God and not that of the government intelligence agencies." The Economist reported that Syrian Christians are well represented in the leadership of the opposition and many of them have increasingly begun to sympathize with the opposition. Social relations between Sunni and Christian communities are friendly; with leaders and members of both communities jointly attending funerals for slain opposition fighters and civilians who were killed by Assad's security appartus, church-based groups ferrying medicine to rebels, and they are also represented in the SNC and local committees. The sectarian animosities that have arisen in certain segments of the disillusioned opposition tend to be directed at Alawites rather than Christians. Despite Assad's government's demands for public support and loyalty from the Christian clergy, most Syrian bishops do not intend to "carry their flocks" in toeing the regime's line.

Many Syrian Christians believe that the Islamist-dominated governments which have been formed since the Arab Spring have become  less willing to recognize the equal rights of Christians. Some fear that they will suffer the same consequences of persecution, ethnic cleansing and discrimination as the indigenous Assyrian (aka Chaldo-Assyrian) Christians of Iraq and Coptic Christians of Egypt if the government is overthrown. Most protests have taken place after Muslim Friday prayer, and the Archbishop of the Syriac Orthodox Church in Aleppo told the Lebanon-based Daily Star, "To be honest, everybody's worried, we don't want what happened in Iraq to happen in Syria. We don't want the country to be divided. And we don't want Christians to leave Syria."

According to International Christian Concern, Christians were attacked by anti-government protesters in mid-2011 because they did not participate in the protests. Christians were present in early demonstrations in Homs, but the entire demonstration walked off when Islamist Salafi slogans were shouted.

Nevertheless, members of Christian sects have not always responded to the war in a uniform manner. The Christian hamlet of Yakubiyah in northern Idlib Province was overrun by rebel forces in late January 2013. Government forces withdrew from Yakubiyah after brief fighting at a checkpoint on the outskirts of the village, sparing the village from destructive street fighting—not a single resident died in the takeover of the town. The population before the war was mixed between Armenian Apostolics and Eastern Catholics, but most Armenians had fled the village with the army, being widely suspected of collaboration. Only some Catholics remained, the group having widely refused to take up arms for the government in Yakubiyah. The two Armenian churches suffered damage as a result of the war. The garden of one had served to house armoured vehicles of the army units who had held the village, and soldiers had used its courtyard as a dump. After rebels took the town, the Armenian churches fell victim to looters, who stole nearly everything of value from them—but also left religious texts alone. The single Catholic church in the village, however, remained untouched. Those residents who had not fled the fighting reported amicable relations with the rebel units occupying the town. However, relations between local Sunni rebels and the remaining Christian civilians in the town broke down catastrophically over the following months. Rebels came to suspect the Christians of harbouring pro-government loyalties, but may have also wanted to seize the property of Christian families. Beginning with the wealthier families, rebels began targeting Yakubiyah's Christians for persecution. In a November 2013 interview, a Christian from the village who fled to the Turkish town of Midyat said that after six Christians were beheaded and after at least 20 other Christians were kidnapped, Yakubiyah was now virtually empty of Christians. She also made it clear by stating that those responsible were not jihadists, stating: "Al-Nusra didn't come to our village; the people who came were from villages close by, and they were Free Syrian Army."

In 2012, the first Christian Free Syrian Army unit formed, yet it was reported that the Syrian government still had the reluctant support of the majority of the country's Christians of various ethnicities and denominations. In 2014, the ethnic Syriac Orthodox Christian Syriac Military Council formed an alliance with the FSA, and other Assyrian Christian militias such as the Sutoro had joined the Syrian opposition against the Syrian government in allegiance with the YPG-led Syrian Democratic Forces.

Attacks on Christians and churches
According to several claims which were made by various sources, Christians have been attacked and persecuted, either by members of opposition groups or by groups which support the government. As of 2019, around 61% of churches damaged in the Syrian civil war were targeted by the government forces. Out of the 124 documented incidents of violence against Christian religious centres between 2011 and 2019; 75 attacks were perpetrated the forces loyal to the Assad regime and 33 by various factions of the opposition.

Some sources inside the Syriac Orthodox Church reported in 2012 an "ongoing ethnic cleansing of Christians" is being carried out by the Free Syrian Army. In a communication received by Agenzia Fides, the sources claimed that over 90% of the Christians of Homs have been expelled by militant Islamists of the Farouq Brigades who went door to door, forcing Christians to flee without their belongings and confiscating their homes. Mgr. Giuseppe Nazzaro, the Vicar of Aleppo later clarified that these reports were unconfirmed. 

The Christian population of Homs had dropped from a pre-conflict total of 160,000 down to about 1,000 in early 2012, due to heavy clashes between Syrian Arab Army and the Free Syrian Army. Jesuit sources in Homs said the reason for the exodus was not because of threats from insurgent groups, but  rather over the Christians' fears over the situation and that they had left on their own initiative to escape the conflict between government forces and insurgents. Other charitable organisations and some local Christian families reported to Fides that they were expelled from Homs because they were considered "close to the regime". Fides said that Islamist opposition groups not only targeted those who refused to join the demonstrations, but also other Christians who were in favour of the opposition. According to the Catholic Near East Welfare Association, opposition forces had occupied some historical churches in the old city district of Homs, leading to the Saint Mary Church of the Holy Belt being damaged during clashes with the Syrian army, and opposition groups also vandalised icons inside some of the churches.

Local sources told Fides that Christians in Qusayr, a town near Homs, were given an ultimatum in 2012 to leave by armed Sunni rebel groups. Christian refugees from Qusayr, a town with a Christian population of 10,000 before the war, also reported that their male relatives had been killed by rebels. The Vicar Catholic Apostolic of Aleppo, Giuseppe Nazzaro, stated that such reports were unconfirmed but noted that intolerant Islamist and terrorist movements are becoming more visible. He recalled a car bomb which exploded near a Franciscan school in Aleppo narrowly missing children present there. These reports were also strongly denied by opposition groups who instead blamed the government forces for inflicting the damage and forced displacements. For its part, the Vatican's ambassador in Syria, Mario Zenari, denied that Christians were being discriminated, saying they shared the "same sorry fate as the rest of the Syrian people."

In 2012, Robert Fisk and official Orthodox sources claimed that an attack on Christians in Saidnaya was perpetrated by the FSA.

In a 2012 report by Al-Ahram, Abdel-Ahad Astifo, an opposition Syrian National Council member and director of the European branch of the Christian Assyrian Democratic Organisation, stated that "The regime's forces and death squads are bombing both churches and mosques in several Syrian cities, with the aim of blaming others and injecting sectarian discord into the country." On 26 February 2012, Al-Arabiya reported that Christians in Syria were being persecuted by the government, though the majority of those claims were rejected by official Christian sources in Syria. The Al Arabiya article claimed that the government was targeting churches for perceived support to the opposition. In another incident, Al-Arabiya reported that government forces attacked and raided the historic Syriac Orthodox Saint Mary Church of the Holy Belt in Homs. Official Syrian church sources maintained that it was the anti-government militias that used the church as a shield and later damaged its contents on purpose. Al-Arabiya reports in 2012 stated that the Syrian government has been persecuting Christian community leaders by various means. In one instance, a Christian activist sympathetic to the opposition told the newspaper that one priest had been killed by the government's forces and then state-run TV blamed government opposition for his death.

In 2012, British conservative politician Edward Leigh issued alarm over the collapse of Assad regime and its implications for Syrian Christians under a potential majoritarian rule. Syrian Christian refugees frequently express fear of rebels. When the town of Ras al-Ayn was captureed by the FSA and al-Nusra from the government and the Kurdish-led PYD in late 2012, the Assyrian International News Agency reported that much of the town's Assyrian Christian population fled almost overnight. One refugee stated "The so-called Free Syrian Army, or rebels, or whatever you choose to call them in the West, emptied the city of its Christians, and soon there won't be a single Christian in the whole country."

On 23 April 2013, the Greek Orthodox and Syriac Orthodox archbishops of Aleppo, Paul (Yazigi) and Yohanna Ibrahim, were kidnapped near Aleppo by an armed Chechen group. The president of the Syrian National Council George Sabra confirmed that the bishops are being held by a rebel group in the vicinity of Aleppo. On 2 July 2013, the Vatican reported that Syriac Catholic priest Francois Murad was killed by rebel militia in Ghassaniyah on 23 June while taking refuge in a Franciscan convent.

Syrian Churches have been demolished by Turkistan Islamic Party in Syria fighters. In Jisr al-Shughur, according to Jihadology.net, a Church's cross had a TIP flag placed on top of it after the end of the battle. The Uzbek group Katibat al-Tawhid wal Jihad (Tavhid va Jihod katibasi) released a video featuring themselves and the TIP attacking and desecrating Christian Churches in Jisr al-Shughur. Jabhat al Nusra and Turkistan Islamic Party fighters cleansed the rural area around Jisr al-Shughour of its Syrian Christian inhabitants and slit the throat of a Syrian Christian along with his wife accusing them of being Syrian government agents, according to the Syrian Observatory for Human Rights. Al-Arabiya said that the area was Alawite. In the area to Aleppo's southwest, the entry via Turkey of Uyghurs into Syria was reported by a Syrian Christian who said they have seized control of Al Bawabiya village.

In January 2016, Kurdish Asayish security forces said members of the pro-government National Defence Forces were behind two bomb blasts that killed nearly 20 people in a Christian section of the city of Qamishli. Syrian Network of Human Rights stated in 2019: "The Syrian regime has always invoked good slogans, but on the ground, it has done the opposite. While the regime claims that it has not committed any violations, and that it is keen on protecting the Syrian state and the rights of minorities, it has carried out qualitative operations in suppressing and terrorizing all those who sought political change and reform, regardless of religion or race, and of whether this causes the destruction of the heritage of Syria and the displacement of its minorities."

Arab Christians
The Arab Christians are mainly located in western Syria in Valley of Christians who are mainly Greek Orthodox or Melkites (Greek Catholics). The largest Christian denominations in Syria are the Greek Orthodox church, and the Melkite Greek Catholic Church, who are exclusively Arab Christians, followed by the Syriac Orthodox. The appellation "Greek" refers to the liturgy which they use, sometimes, it is used in reference to the ancestry and ethnicity of the members, but not all of the members are of Greek ancestry; in fact, the Arabic word which is used is "Rum", which means "Byzantines", or Eastern Romans. Generally, the term is used in reference to the Greek liturgy, and the Greek Orthodox denomination in Syria. Arabic is now its main liturgical language.

Assyrians

The Assyrian people, mainly located in the Northeast of Syria (with the bulk of their population in neighbouring northern Iraq, and others in south east Turkey and north west Iran), are ethnically and linguistically distinct from the main group of Syrian Christians, in that unlike the latter, who are of Aramean heritage but largely now Arabic speaking, Assyrians are of ancient Assyrian/Mesopotamian heritage, retain Eastern Aramaic as a spoken tongue, and are often members of the Assyrian Church of the East or Chaldean Catholic Church, as well as the Syriac Orthodox Church.

Unlike other Christian groups, The Assyrian dominated Christian militias in Syria are primarily allied with anti government Kurdish forces, whose secular attitude and tolerance of the minority has allowed for them both to work well in fighting against ISIS/ISIL, the enemy of both peoples. Some are pro-secularist opposition, with one militia member stating "the [Assad] regime wants us to be puppets, deny our ethnicity and demand an Arab-only state". However, other armed Assyrian groups in al-Hassakah such as Sootoro, ally themselves with the government, and have clashed with Kurdish YPG forces whom they accuse of trying to steal Assyrian lands.

Assyrian communities, towns and villages have been targeted by Islamist rebels, and Assyrians have taken up arms against such extremists as ISIS, and Assyrians and their militias and political organizations are staunchly anti-government. The Assyrian Democratic Organization is a founding member of the Syrian National Council and it is also a member of the executive committee of the council. The ADO, however, have only participated at peaceful demonstrations and have warned against a "surge in the national and sectarian extremism".

On 15 August 2012, members of the Syriac nationalist Syriac Union Party stormed the Syrian embassy in Stockholm in protest of the Syrian government. A dozen of its members were later detained by Swedish police.
By October 2012, the Syrian Syriac National Council had been formed. In January 2013, a military wing, the Syrian Syriac Military council, was formed, based in Al-Hasakah Governorate, home to a large Assyrian Christian population.

Many Assyrian Christians found refuge in the Tur Abdin region in southern Turkey as fighting reached north-eastern Syrian by spring 2013. Many of them reported to have fled after they were targeted by armed rebels.

By January 2014, the Syriac Military Council affiliated to the PYD.

Several fighters killed in clashes prompted by Assyrians' move to set up checkpoints in Qamishli in fear of ISIL.

Armenians
Many diaspora Armenians, from both the Apostolic and Catholic churches, have fled the fighting in Syria, with 7,000 emigrating to Armenia and a further 5,000 to Lebanon by February 2013. However, most Armenians still express support for Bashar Al-Assad and fear the fall of the government, considering him as a protector for the Christians persecution by Muslim extremists.

A controversy over the role of Turkey in the Syrian civil war also occurred due to the manner and means of which Al-Nusra Front sacked the city of Kessab, which was looked at as one of the most significant Armenian majority towns in Syria. News agencies and local residents of Kessab reported that the town's Armenian Catholic and Evangelical churches had been ruined and burnt by the Islamist groups, along with the Misakyan Cultural Centre. Around 250 families from Kessab who had taken refuge in Latakia returned to their homes a day after the Syrian Army recaptured the town.

Kurds

The Syrian Civil War created a lot of instability in the region, providing opportunities for Kurdish actors to take control of parts of northern Syria. A result of this has been the creation of Kurdistana Rojava (West Kurdistan), an autonomous Kurdish zone within Syria. In this region, an autonomous administration and self-governing institutions have been set up and led by Kurds, also known as the Democratic Federation of Northern Syria. This new autonomous government, albeit fragile, has become an important aspect in Syrian geopolitics and for many Kurds. However, the position of the Kurds in war-torn Syria is a precarious one, where violence along ethnic and sectarian lines continues as well as the Kurdish struggle against opponents like Turkey and IS. The road towards Kurdish inclusion and equality in Syria as well as solving Kurdish issues has been arduous and is continuing still.

Kurds in Syria 
Kurdistan, centered on the Zagros mountain range on the borders of present-day Turkey, Iran, Iraq and Syria, is where the majority of the Kurds live. Estimates are that there are around 30 million Kurds around the world, mainly dispersed in the Middle East. Approximately 1 million live in Syria and are viewed as a minority by the ruling elite because they are "a group of people, differentiated from others in the same society by race, nationality, religion, or language, who both think of themselves as a differentiated group and are of thought by others as a differentiated group with negative connotations.” Most Kurds live in the region of Rojava in Western Kurdistan, with Qamishli as the largest Kurdish city in Syria and considered as the de facto capital of Western Kurdistan. Many of the Kurds living in Syria have a Turkish background because of their exodus from Turkey during the Kurdish uprisings in this country in 1925. With this exodus from Turkey, Kurdish nationalist intellectuals arrived in Syria as well, bringing the idea of a "national Kurdish group" to the small population of Kurds already living in Syria. Because of their Turkish origin, many Kurds in northern Syria were deprived of the right to vote when the French mandate began in 1920. Even so, Kurds in Syria have positioned themselves differently from region to region. Kurds in Afrin and Damascus supported the French, while the majority of the Kurdish tribes in the Jazirah and Jarabulus region cooperated with Turkish troops loyal to Mustafa Kemal. This difference in loyalty showed the various attitudes of the Kurds towards the mandate. Where some tribes supported Turkish troops, some leading Kurdish families like al-Yusiv and Shamdin opposed Arab nationalism, which Kemal propagated, because it "threatened their ethnic and clan-based networks". Even though a sense of a Kurdish national identity developed slowly during the French mandate, prominent leaders of the Syrian Kurds like the Bedir Khan brothers furthered the cause of Kurdish nationalism.

Institutionalization of sectarian division under the French Mandate 
When Syria fell under French colonial rule in 1920, the position of the Kurds in Syria changed. The French authorities used the strategy of divide and rule to control and govern rural and urban elites and ethnic and religious minorities. Contrary to how the British ruled Iraq, the French mandate system did not seek support from the Sunni-Arab majority, but started defending non-Sunni minorities, under which the Kurds. The French authority for instance allowed the activities of the Khobyun League and their pursuit in strengthening the Kurdish position into one national organization. Indeed, as Tejel describes it, the French mandate actually used sectarian division to be able to govern Syria. For the Kurds, the foundation of the Xoybun League in 1927 meant an unison on the part of the Kurds in their fight against Turkey. For the Kurds, Turkey formed a threat to Kurdish nationalism and their pursuit for independence. For the French, the alliance with the Kurds was politically used as well in their border disputes with Turkey. Researchers like Tejel and Alsopp argue that the French mandate used the "Kurdish card" as a tool to keep opposing states at bay, while at the same time ensuring the loyalty of the Kurds in their colonial rule. The Kurds and the early rise of Kurdish nationalism was therefore embedded in a country divided by sectarian lines.

Oppression by the Syrian government 
As a minority having been denied rights by the government throughout history, the Kurds have opposed Arab nationalist regimes in Syria for decades. Oppression of the Kurds already began with the end of the First World War, when the Syrian government disenfranchised many Kurds in modern Syria, separating the Kurds into three separate states. Following the end of the French Mandate in Syria in 1946, a census called Decree no. 93 stripped more than 120.000 Syrian Kurds of their Syrian citizenship, leaving them stateless. Now rendered ajanib (foreigners in Arabic), they could not vote, own land or any other kind of property, work for the government or marry legally. Furthermore, stateless Kurds had no passports, disabling them to travel, were not admitted to public hospitals and were not able to apply for food subsidies. According to several researchers and organizations, the number of stateless Syrian Kurds has increased since 1962 to over 300.000 stateless Kurds, because all children of stateless Kurdish fathers inherit the same status. This discriminatory policy towards the Kurds was partly influenced by Mohammed Talib Hilal, chief of police in the 1960s, who referred to the Kurds as a “malignant tumor” .

Following Decree 93, the Kurdish status was further reduced when the creation of an Arab Belt under the government of the pan-Arab Ba'ath party in 1963 expropriated Kurds from their lands on Turkish- and Iraqi borders. Up until the Syrian civil war, several regulations and decrees put in place discriminated the Kurds further. Kurdish history in schoolbooks was erased from 1967 onwards, children with Kurdish first names were not registered when decree No.122 was put in place in 1992, and cultural material in the Kurdish language like books and videos were banned in 2000 under resolution 768. According to several scholars, these and other measures showed the state's hostility towards the Kurds. Yet, the state too, just like the French Mandate, has used the 'Kurdish card' as well. In 1980, the Kurds (together with the Alawites and other minorities) were employed to crush the problems happening in Aleppo, where the Muslim Brotherhood was revolting in 1982. This resulted in the Sunni Arab majority to view the Kurds as a collaborator with the regimes repression policy.

It was in this post-independence period that Syrian Kurdish political parties emerged, advocating for democracy in Syria and a free and united Kurdistan. However, the first Kurdish political party, Partîya Dêmokrat a Kurdî li Sûriyê, was soon crushed when Kurdish areas became Arabized by the Ba’ath party in the 1960s. Seizing power in a coup, Hafiz al-Assad made Syria a one-party state in 1970 and made Arab unity its ultimate goal. In this way, pursuing Arab nationalism legitimized the oppression of the Syrian Kurds, unless they assimilated themselves to the Arab identity of Syria. Therefore, ever since the end of the French Mandate, the Kurds and Kurdish identity has been seen as a threat by the Syrian state and until after the start of the Syrian uprising in 2011, little has been done to halt the state's discriminatory treatment of Kurds in Syria. Scholars argue that the discrimination is seen by the majority of the Kurds as a threat to their national and ethnic identity, providing the main reason for establishing Syrian Kurdish political parties.

Kurdish opposition by Syrian opposition groups 
Kurds have not only found opposition (and oppression) by the Syrian government, also opposition groups to the Assad regime, like the Muslim Brotherhood, countered Kurdish aspirations. During the Qamishli event in 2004 for example, did many Syrian Arabs oppose Kurds’ quest for democratic rights. The Muslim Brotherhood rejected the idea of giving autonomy for the Kurds and argued that democracy, equality and diversity would solve their problem after the 2004 events. They argued giving autonomy to Kurds would cause fragmentation of Syria as there are many minority groups. Especially the strive for a Kurdish nation-state in Syria was problematic for the Muslim Brotherhood. "While it is considered acceptable for Syrian Arabs to proclaim that “We are Syrian Arabs who are part of the Arab nation,” it is not permitted for the Syrian Kurds to say “We are Syrian Kurds who are part of the Kurdish nation". The rising popularity of Arab nationalism in Syria both within the Syrian regime as well as in opposition groups threatened the Kurdish interests increasingly.

Kurdish politics and their relation with the Syrian state 
The Kurdish movement in Syria has a long history and many political parties have been established on behalf of the Kurds since 1957. Even though almost all Kurdish political parties demand recognition of Kurdish identities, seek to secure their rights (political, social and cultural) and try to end the oppression and discrimination by the Syrian government, there have been deep divisions between the political parties, resulting in at least eleven splits between 1957 and 2011. With over fifteen major political parties and twenty minor political parties, there are five parties in Syria having the broadest support and wielding the most power.

    Partîya Dêmokrat a Kurdî li Sûriyê (el-Partî)
   Partîya Yekîtî  ya Dêmokrat a Kurd li Sûriyê
   Partîya Yekîtî  ya Kurd li Sûriyê
    Partîya Azadî  ya Kurd li Suryê

Between 1990 and 2000, seven more splits and four mergers between parties happened and between 2004 and 2010 over seven new Kurdish political parties were established. With all these new and slightly different parties, it is striking that only after the Qasmishli event in 2004 the nature of the newly created parties changed significantly from former parties. One of the parties established between 2004 and 2010 is the Kurdistan Freedom Movement (Harakah Huriyah Kurdistan). This party has used arms and violence to advocate for Kurdish liberation in Syria. The Kurdistan Freedom Movement has been oppressed and crushed by the Syrian government, just like Yekitiya Azadi ya Qamislo, another party of the more militant wing. These alternative parties expressed the anger and frustration with the Syrian government of mainly Kurdish youth. Shortly after the Qamishli event in 2004, several Kurdish political parties attempted to unite the political movement to bring a halt to the continuing factionalism between the parties. However, personal ambitions and divisions challenged these attempts.

The PYD and the KNC 
Two relatively new parties, the Kurdish Democratic Union Party (PYD) and the Kurdish National Council (KNC) (a coalition of Kurdish political parties), currently divide the Syrian Kurds. These two parties are linked to other Kurdish rival parties based in the region. PYD is affiliated with the Kurdistan Workers Party (PKK) in turkey, while the KNC has ties with the Kurdistan Regional Government (KRG) in Iraq. In 2003, followers of Abdullah Öcalan (founder of the PKK) formed the PYD. This was made possible by the Syrian regime who allowed the PKK to reside in bases and training camps in Syria. Although the two parties are grounded in the same ideological convictions, there have been tensions and both parties are organizationally distinct. When the Syrian Civil war started, the PYD had already distanced itself from the PKK and no longer sees Öcalan as its leader. The KNC was established in 2011 and attracted most Syrian Kurds not affiliated with the PYD. Alongside these two main parties, a few minor movements like the Future Movement and the Kurdish National Alliance exist. However, the PYD and KNC have played major roles for the Kurds in Syria during the Syrian uprising. Both the PYD and the KNC seek to establish autonomy for Kurds in Syria, but the KNC claimed that the PYD was too closely connected to the regime, accusing the party of creating division between the Kurds, because the PYD was associated with the PKK and Assad supported the PKK to keep Turkey at bay.

Political parties' position towards the state 
Kurdish political parties were forced to develop some form of relationship with the Syrian government if they wanted to be able to address Kurdish interests. Prior to the Syrian uprising, Kurdish parties adopted three approaches towards the Syrian regime: expressing Kurdish issues through demonstrations and protests, nurturing relations with the Arab opposition in order to influence the Syrian state and fostering direct relations with the state via (unofficial) negotiations with the government. In these ways, Kurdish political parties engaged with the Syrian state, which changed drastically with the Syrian uprising. Hence, before the uprising, Kurds generally accepted the fact of the necessity to engage with state officials to further Kurdish goals. Most political parties were cautious to confront the regime and tried not to cross the ‘red lines’ set out by the Syrian government. Consequently, up until the Syrian uprisings all these parties have operated relatively low-profile and without violence. Growing tensions between the parties have kept them in an uneasy rivalry and sources differ according to the question if the PYD and the KNC can cooperate together to fight Assad's regime or if the parties remain in a rival deadlock.

The road towards sectarian struggle 
Kurdish politics has always been illegal in Syria and so all their activities are monitored and suppressed by Syrian security organizations. Nonetheless, over twenty Kurdish political parties existed by the time the Syrian civil war started and most parties focused on bringing an end to Kurdish oppression and human right violations. The aim of these parties is to bring democracy to Syria in order to end the one-party rule by Assad. However, before the Syrian uprising in 2011, only a few parties advocated for independence for the Kurds and none of the Kurdish parties has called for the creation of a Kurdish state.

Hence, Kurdish political movements have taken a relatively non-aggressive stance towards the Syrian state prior to the Syrian uprising as well as after the war started.. Before 2000, Kurdish public protests almost never occurred and demonstrations were virtually non-existent. However, after the Qamishli event in 2004, a riot between the local football team (Kurdish) and fans of the opposing team (Sunni Arab), Kurdish people and parties demonstrated en masse and public actions increased significantly. The willingness of the Kurdish political parties and the Kurds involved in the 2004 uprising to publicly confront the state, shows a gradual shift of the Kurdish people to become more visible and to be more involved in actions directed against the regime. After the 2004 events, political parties like Yekîtî and the PYD started to politice the ethnicity of the Kurds by claiming that the Syrian government repressed the Kurds throughout history because of their ethnicity, which prompted the Kurds to act in a more united way. Nevertheless, until the Syrian uprising in 2011, requiring the Kurdish political parties to come to some form of unity, the parties were deeply divided..This division was fueled by Assad who posed the Kurdish riots as “a foreign Kurdish conspiracy”. Doing so, the Syrian regime used sectarian divisions to undermine and fracture any form of protest by casting such rebellion as a hindrance for Syrian unity.

Practicing sectarianism 
Amidst the violent sectarian conflict during the Syrian civil war, the PYD has deployed a relatively pragmatic stance, resulting in an autonomous federal government in the northern part of Syria. Emerging as the most powerful Kurdish political party amongst the Kurds, the PYD governed this 822-kilometer-long area on the Turkish-Syrian border during the first years of the Syrian civil war.

Even though the PYD found itself in a position of power when the Assad regime withdrew his military forces from border-towns in the north of Syria, this was not the case in the initial phase of the war. Indeed, prior to the outbreak of the civil war and during the outbreak of the sectarian conflict, the party was in a political crisis. With the Yekîtî demonstration in 2002 and the Qamishli uprising in 2004, national consciousness amongst the Kurds was growing. This increasing awareness that the Kurds shared a common identity, culture and belief, led the Kurds to strongly critique the political parties like the PYD because of their relatively weak stance against the regime and their support to maintain the status quo. Even though Kurdish political parties supported this national consciousness among the Kurds, they were not keen on fuelling the sectarian strife of the Kurds right from the start, because it would give the regime the possibility to label the uprisings as sectarian. This in turn could lead the protests and demonstrations to be crushed immediately. However, according to an extensive geopolitical study on sectarianism in the Syrian civil war, sectarian fragmentation had been already present with the execution of the millet system in the Ottoman Empire, where a “divide to rule” policy segregated the different communities. The Syrian civil war enhanced sectarian identities and almost all parties (e.g. the Assad regime, rebel groups, minorities) have exploited the embedded divisiveness in Syria for their own gains. Hence, sectarianism is seen as being both a cause and consequence of the Syrian civil war.

Establishing an autonomous region 

Even though the PYD was struggling to maintain a loyal base of followers, the party quickly gained momentum when the ongoing conflict between the Syrian regime and the armed opposition increased. Where initially the PYD did not get involved in the war, this changed when Assad withdrew his military forces from several towns in northern Syria. Considering the PYD was the only Kurdish political organization with a military force, the PYD seized this opportunity to capture these now unarmed towns. The military wing of the PYD, the People's Protection Units (YPG) took nearly every town in northern Syria where a Kurdish majority lived in just two months. By January 2014, three autonomous cantons were established in the northern part of Syria, Rojava. The PYD's strength in the Kurdish regions in Syria is because of this well-organized and well-trained military wing. The PYD has enough resources to recruit, train and commit potential sympathizers to the party and now has an estimated 10.000-20.000 armed members.

The PYDs pragmatic policy 
Where the PYD's pragmatism gave this Kurdish organization several opportunities to cooperate for its own gains, the party also received many accusations by Syrian Kurds for collaborating with the Assad regime and the PKK in exchange for power in northern Syria. The PKK argues that they do see Assad as a dictator, but "if Assad doesn't attack Kurds we will not go to war.” Although the PYD has denied these accusations, there have been several instances during the Syrian civil war where the party collaborated with its opponents, like the PKK and the Syrian regime. Despite the PKK supporting the Assad regime, the PYD did have ties with this armed group – considered by the United States, Turkey and the European Union as a terrorist group - and received training in guerrilla warfare. Furthermore, the PYD has worked together with Assad military forces to fight the Islamic State which both actors perceived as a greater security threat. Although the PYD rhetorically opposes the Assad regime, the party has opted for a pragmatist policy towards Assad, which has, amongst other things, resulted in sharing power with the Syrian regime in two other Syrian northern towns: Qamishli and Hasakah. Indeed, according to several authors, precisely this pragmatic stance has led to the party's success and survival.

Kurdification in Rojava 
On 10 October 2015, the YPG together with Arab, Assyrian, Armenian and Turkmen militias set up the Syrian Democratic Forces (SDF). By early 2016, the PYD had driven the Islamic State out the Kurdish areas the PYD controlled and received the United States protection against the Islamic State and Turkey. With this support, the PYD was able to increase their territory in northern Syria and take the city of Hasaka in 2015. With the tides turning in their favour, the PYD installed a radical 'Kurdification' policy as part of their “Rojava revolution”. This radical democratic movement is aimed to not only establish an independent state during the sectarian struggle, but also to homogenize the ethnically diverse Rojava by using political power. With a ‘re-Kurdification’ of Arabized Kurds, the PYD hopes to strengthen their position in areas where the Arabs are in the majority. In order to keep this territory under control, the PYD has to delegate power to local Arab chieftains in areas where the Kurds are in the minority. This “blurring of sectarian lines” can be a strategic gamble or an attempt to cooperate with the Arabs to keep Rojava. Here, the PYD uses the sectarian conflict in Syria to preach Kurdish nationalism as a democratic confederalism, promoting secularism, socialism and equality. However, several researchers argue that their struggle for Kurdish nationalism is only a tool for power politics.

Currently, the Democratic Federation of Northern Syria (DFNS) embeds the autonomous administration led by the Kurds. DFNS is still part of the Syrian state, but is autonomous in the sense that it executes self-governance. The Administrative Regions Act, which has been passed in August 2017, divides the Rojava into six cantons and three regions. The DFNS recognises and accepts all ethnic groups living in the Kurdis-led regions and promotes coexistence between the different communities. DFSN states that: “Cultural, ethnic and religious groups and components shall have the right to name their self-administrations, preserve their cultures, and form their democratic organizations. No one or component shall have the right to impose their own beliefs on others by force”. This democratic confederalism is the foundational doctrine of Rojava and is developed by Abdullah Öcalan, the founder of the PKK. In this concept, state power is decentralised by letting small, local councils govern. However, in this northern Kurdish border zone, encompassing a mix of different minorities, ‘Kurdification’ is still pursued by the SDF. Furthermore, even though the DFNS claims it promotes local democracy, researchers argue that the power is very centralized, even authoritarian. Some news sources call this ‘re-Kurdification’ as just another form of oppression and argue that the PYD uses education as a tool of indoctrinization of PKK-Öcalan ideology. By closing down schools who reject to follow the PKK curriculum and using their authority to deliberately force Arab families to leave their home in Kurdish-controlled areas, the PYD is accused of "mirroring the practices of the Assad regime in areas it controls".

Current situation 
In 2017, the SDF controlled around 25% of Syria. The hold on these territories by the SDF was firm until Turkey launched an offensive in October 2019. Turkey's operation was aimed to create a 'safe zone' in Syria in order to push back the YPG (which Turkey sees as a terrorist organization) and relocate Syrian refugees. This offensive has resulted in significant territorial loss for the SDF, under which key cities like Tel Abyad and Ras Al-Ayn. Even though the United States supported the Kurds to fight IS back in 2014, when Erdogan told President Trump Turkey would begin with its cross-border operation to secure the safe-zone, President Trump said that the US troops would not get involved in this conflict.  On October 13, 2019, the Turkish offensive began with air strikes and shelling, resulting in over 13.000 people to flee the area. With Kurdish forces concentrating on defending itself against Turkey, hundreds of IS-fighters and people suspected to have links with IS escaped from the camps in this affected area in which they had been held. Currently, north-eastern Syria is divided by SDF-controlled areas, the Syrian regime forces, opposition militia and Turkish forces.

Druze

The Syrian Druze are concentrated in the southern province of Suwayda (or Sweida) and have become progressively more opposed to the government during the civil war, with Druze leaders making statements against the Syrian government, Druze religious leaders being jailed for not celebrating the reelection of Assad, and community members refusing to serve conscription terms in the Syrian Arab Army or join pro Syrian government forces. The Druze have been particularly opposed to members of their community being forced into Syrian government military service, with violent demonstrations and kidnappings of Syrian government security forces to force the release young Druze men captured to be forced into army conscription, and incidents of the community breaking Druze individuals out of the Syrian government prisons. Some of the small minority of the Druze population who reside in the Israeli occupied Golan Heights (< 3% of all Syrian Druze) have affirmed their loyalty to the Syrian government. They have created their own militias such as Dareh al-Watan (As-Suwayda), Jaysh al-Muwahhideen (Qunietra), Kata’ib Humat al-Diyar (As-Suwayda) and Lebayk ya Salman (Qunietra)

In early 2013, it was reported that Druze were increasingly joining and supporting the opposition and had formed Druze-dominated battalions within the FSA. In January 2013, "dozens of Druze fighters joined a rebel assault on a radar base [...] in Sweida province". In February 2013, several dozen Druze religious leaders in Sweida called on Druze to desert the Syrian military and gave their blessing to the killing of "murderers" within the government. Lebanese Druze politician Walid Jumblatt, leader of the Progressive Socialist Party (PSP), has also urged Syrian Druze to join the opposition. In 2012 it was reported that the majority of Druze villages in the northern Idlib Province were supporting the opposition but were not involved in fighting.

In 2012, there were at least four car bombings in pro-government areas of Jaramana, a town near Damascus with a Druze and Christian majority. The Syrian government claimed that these were sectarian attacks on Druze and Christians by Islamist rebels. Opposition activists and some Druze politicians claimed that the government itself is carrying out the attacks (see false flag) to stoke sectarian tensions and push the Druze into conflict with the opposition.

In 2013, Israel is reportedly increasingly reaching out to the Druze of the Golan Heights with the intention of potentially creating a reliable buffer proxy force in the event Syria collapses into sectarian strife and anarchy in the near future.

In early 2015, a Druze delegation from the Sweida province which was seeking aid from the government due to increasing attacks by ISIL was accused of being unpatriotic and rebuffed, because it refuse to join the Syrian government's forces. Druze have refused to join Hezbollah led militias sent by the Syrian government, as they would expect to be sent to fight Sunnis.

A massacre of Druze at the hands of Al-Qaeda affiliate Al-Nusra Front took place in June 2015 in Idlib. Nusrah issued an apology after the incident. Foreign Policy noted that there is absolutely no reference to the Druze in Al-Nusra's "apology", since Al-Nusrah forced the Druze to renounce their religion, destroyed their shrines and now considers them Sunni. Nusra and ISIL are both against the Druze, the difference being that Nusra is apparently satisfied with destroying Druze shrines and making them become Sunnis while ISIL wants to violently annihilate them like it did to Yazidis. The Druze land was taken by Turkmen.

After Jabal al-Arba'een was subjected to bombardment by the coalition, foreign fighters fled to Jabal al-Summaq. Homes of the Druze religious minority of Jabal al-Summaq's Kuku village were forcibly stolen and attacked by Turkistan Islamic Party Uyghurs and Uzbeks.

Shias

Twelver Shias

Twelver Shia Muslims are a small minority in Syria. They are found in a number of villages in rural Aleppo (Al-Zahraa and Nubl), Homs (Akkum, Al-Aqrabiyah, Al-Masriyah, Al-Mazraa, Al-Thabitiyah, Al-Zurzuriyah, Ghawr Gharbiyah, Hawsh al-Sayyid Ali, Umm al-Amad and Zita al-Gharbiyah) and Idlib (Al-Fu'ah, Kafriya and Zarzur) in northern Syria as well as in Rif Dimashq (Sayyidah Zaynab) and Daraa (Bosra) in southern Syria.

In October 2012, various Iraqi religious sects join the conflict in Syria on both sides. Twelfer Shiites from Iraq, in Babil Governorate and Diyala Governorate, have traveled to Damascus from Tehran, or from the Shiite holy city of Najaf, Iraq, to protect Sayyidah Zaynab, an important Twelfer Shiite shrine in Damascus.

In December 2012, Syrian rebel forces burned the Shia 'Husseiniya' mosque in the northern town of Jisr al-Shughur, inciting fears that the salafist groups would wage an all out war against Syria's minority religions.

On 25 May 2013, Nasrallah announced that Hezbollah is fighting in the Syrian Civil War against Islamic extremists and "pledged that his group will not allow Syrian rebels to control areas that border Lebanon".  In the televised address, he said, "If Syria falls in the hands of America, Israel and the takfiris, the people of our region will go into a dark period."

Jaysh al-Islam leader Zahran Alloush gave a speech during Ramadan of 2013 attacking Shia whom he called "Rafidis" and Alawites, whom he called "Nusayris" and the "Majus" (Zoroastrians), saying "the Mujahideen of Shaam will cleanse Shaam of the Filth of Rafidis & Rafidism, they will cleanse it for ever in sha Allah, till they will cleanse the land of Shaam of the filth of the Majoos (Fireworshippers) who fought the Religion of Allah the Almighty","the Shia are still despicable & pitiful though history", "And I give you the news, oh Filthy Rafidis: Just as Saddam Hussein crushed your heads (Shia) in the Past, the people of Ghouta & Shaam will crush them soon, They will make you taste a painful torment in this world, before Allah makes you taste it in the Hereafter, Oh you unclean Rafidis! You will collide into what you've never expected of Power from the Mujahideen of Islam".

Jaysh al-Islam released a video showing the execution of ISIS members and showed a Jaysh al-Islam Sharī'ah official named Shaykh Abu Abd ar-Rahman Ka'ka (الشيخ أبو عبد الرحمن كعكة) gave a speech condemning "those who want (ISIS) to achieve" (وما الذي يريدون أن يحققوه), as "of the Madhhab of the Khawarij" (إنه مذهب الخوارج), "madhhab of hypocrisy" (مذهب النفاق), "madhhab of Abdullah ibn Saba' the Jew, who are joined with those under the banner of the dogs of (hell) fire "( مذهب عبد الله بن سبأ اليهودي إنه الإنضمام تحت لواء كلاب أهل النار).

The former official Twitter account of Zahran Alloush zahran1970 which was suspended by Twitter, sent out multiple direct messages calling people "soldier of the Nusayri Electronic Army" and "follower of the Jew ibn Saba'", and "enemy of Allah", along with the last portion of Quran verse 3:119 (قل موتوا بغيظكم إن الله عليم بذات الصدور) which tells people to die in rage and that Allah knows what is in their breasts.

Ismaili
Ismaili Shias are also found around Hama region (Masyaf and al-Qadmus) and in Salamiyah, and were early supporters of the uprising against the government.

As of March 2015 opposition activists have accused the government of attempting to stoke sectarian tentions in eastern Hama and Salamiyah, the burial place of the Ismaili sect's founder Ismail bin Jaafar, with recruitment drives aimed at Ismailis for pro-government militias for the purpose of setting up checkpoints to harass, rob and kill Sunnis. The Ismaili community has been known to be peaceful and aimed at not engaging in any form of sectarianism and avoiding national conflict, perhaps under the spiritual guidance of its cultured Imam abroad, his Highness the Aga Khan IV.  An Ismaili delegation that traveled to Damascus seeking aid from increasing ISIS attacks were reportedly told by Assad: "You have 24,000 draft dodgers in Salamiyeh. Let them join", referring to the fact that Ismailis do not wish to be associated with government militias, and the NDF has stood accused of refusing to protect Ismaili villages and looting Ismaili victims of ISIS attacks.

Sufis

Sufis Muslims who mostly live in Damascus and Aleppo and in Deir al-Zor. Due to the Syrian Civil War, many are split into pro-government, pro-opposition and neutral currents. Sheikh Mohamed Said Ramadan Al-Bouti, a well-known Sufi cleric who had close ties to the authorities, was killed in a bombing at the Iman Mosque in Damascus. He had strongly criticized protesters and demonstrators in his support for the government. The government and the opposition have accused each other of the assassination. His son appeared on Syrian television where he supported the governments version of the event.

The only Sufi movement to clearly side with the rebels is the Zayd movement. Its sheikhs resisted government pressure to condemn the opposition's demonstrations. On the contrary, Rifai called for releasing detainees, a halt to their torture, and political reforms. The turning point in the Zayd movement's position occurred when government supporters beat Rifai and attacked his mosque and supporters. He and his younger brother let the country and declared their clear support for the revolution. In addition to the Zayd movement, a number of well-known Syrian sheikhs, among them Mohammad Ratib al-Nabulsi and his students, have supported the armed opposition. Even though the Sufi currently has no significant armed factions as the Sunnis do, observers claim that many Sufi individuals have joined the armed struggle. Some have even established armed factions, among them the Magawir Battalions, the Companions of the Prophet Brigade, and the Descendants of the Prophet Brigade.

During 2013 and 2014, many holy shrines and tombs in the eastern Syrian province of Deir al-Zor affiliated with Sufism have been destroyed by the Islamic State of Iraq and the Levant which have been among the group's main targets.

Turkic

Turkmen
The Syrian Turkmen generally back the opposition and many look to Turkey for protection and support. They have formed their own battalions within the FSA. Turkey has made formal statements of political support for the Syrian Turkmen.

One Turkmen rebel commander in Aleppo claimed that over 700 Turkmen had joined his battalion and 3,000 others were fighting the government in the province. He said that Turkmen had "suffered for 40 years" under the Syrian government, explaining that Hafez al-Assad "took our lands [...] banned our language and stopped us from learning about our history and culture. He stripped us of our rights and changed our villages' names into Arabic names". According to some sources Turkmen militias as of June 2013 number up to 10,000 members.

Since the Russian military intervention in the Syrian Civil War, Turkey has accused Russia in aiding the government in ethnic cleansing against the Turkmen minority in Latakia. This concern increased as hundreds of refugees were caused by the regime capture of Rabiya in January 2016, with "up to 10,000 people living in and around Yamadi" at risk of further displacement.

Uyghurs
The increasing tensions between Uyghurs and Assad's ally China have contributed to the growth of Uyghur militant movement, and some Uyghur groups have gone to Syria to fight the government, mainly as part of the Turkistan Islamic Party.

Yazidi
Yazidis in Syria are an ethno-religious group whose members mostly live in the Al-Hasakah Governorate and the Aleppo Governorate in northern Syria. Estimates of their number vary widely, ranging from less than 4,000 to up to 50,000 in studies which were conducted in 2009-2010. They were subjected to acts of genocide by ISIL in 2014.

In 2021, the Ministry of Justice refused to classify Yazidism as a non-Islamic religion, instead, it classified Yazidism as an Islamic sect.

Dom
The Syrian Doms are a semi-nomadic Indo-Aryan ethnic group who practice Romani mythology and Islam who number 37,000. As a result of the civil war, many Doms have taken shelter in countries such as Lebanon, Jordan, and Iraq.

Palestinians

The reaction of the approximately 500,000 Palestinians living in Syria has been mixed. Some support (or are part of) the opposition, some support the government, and many have tried to keep out of the conflict. There are a number of Palestinian refugee camps (or enclaves) in Syria and a number of Palestinian groups were based there before the war.

During the civil war, there have been clashes between pro-Assad Palestinians (backed by government forces) and anti-Assad Palestinians (backed by the FSA) in Yarmouk – a district of Damascus that is home to the biggest community of Palestinian refugees in Syria. When the uprising began, the Popular Front for the Liberation of Palestine – General Command (PFLP-GC) was based in Yarmouk and strongly backed the government. This led to tensions with anti-government Palestinians of Yarmouk. In June 2011, thousands of Palestinian mourners burnt-down its headquarters there.

As the opposition became militarized, the PFLP-GC has helped government forces fight Palestinian and Syrian rebels in Yarmouk. Several members of the PFLP-GC's central committee opposed this alliance with the government and resigned in protest. A number of its fighters also reportedly defected to the opposition.

Dozens of Palestinians were killed by government strikes on Yarmouk, which led a number of Palestinian groups to condemn the government forces and PFLP-GC. A New York Times article said that these attacks caused many Palestinians to turn against the government. In October 2012, the FSA helped anti-Assad Palestinians form the Liwa al-Asifa (or Storm Brigade). In December 2012, the FSA and Liwa al-Asifa pushed the PFLP-GC and government forces out of Yarmouk. An Israeli think-tank reported that Assad forbade any of the Palestinians fleeing Yarmouk from returning, part of his plan to force Sunnis out of the country.

After the war began, Hamas distanced itself from the Syrian government and its members began leaving Syria. In September 2012, Hamas chief Khaled Meshal publicly announced his support for the Syrian opposition. On 5 November 2012, the government forces shut down all Hamas offices in the country. Meshal said that Hamas had been "forced out" of Damascus because of its disagreements with the Syrian government. A number of Hamas officials have been found dead in Syria; Syrian and Palestinian opposition activists claim that they were "executed" by government forces.

Caucasians
The Caucasians, who migrated to Syria following the Russian conquest of the Caucasus at the 19th century, have been largely divided by the situation in Syria.

Circassians
According to anecdotal documentation, the Circassians of Syria are struggling with a neutral stance like other smaller minorities in Syria. Their villages near the Golan Heights were subjected to skirmishes between rebels and government forces to date. Many Circassians are attempting to return to their ancestral North Caucasus homelands.

Chechens
Unlike the Circassians who try to stay from the conflict, the Chechens, due to historical grievances against Russia, has been a major force in the Syrian opposition group. A lot of ethnic Chechens, not just from Syria but also traveled from Russia and Europe, have formed and participated under various groups, the Jaish al-Muhajireen wal-Ansar, the Caucasus Emirate (Syrian branch), Junud al-Sham and Ajnad al-Kavkaz. Chechen militants are also among the most active, and most violent one in the war. One notable Chechen jihadist is Abu Omar al-Shishani, who was the War Minister of the self-proclaimed Islamic State of Iraq and the Levant.

There are also Chechens working in support of the Syrian government, mostly sent by Chechen strongman Ramzan Kadyrov.

See also
Federalization of Syria

Notes

References

Religion in Syria
Politics of Syria
Syrian civil war
Syrian civil war
Shia–Sunni sectarian violence

pt:Perseguição religiosa no Levante